Georges Benedetti (29 July 1930 – 19 November 2018) was a French politician.

Biography
Georges Benedetti was born to François Benedetti, who was the mayor of Antisanti. Georges followed in his father's political footsteps and became a Senator from Gard under the Socialist Party in 1981. He was also the mayor of Bagnols-sur-Cèze from 1976 to 1989. He was a member of the Board of Directors from the  Regional Institute of Cinema and Audiovisual from 1992 until his death. He also chaired the Antisanti Research Historical Association (Ricerche Storiche of Antisanti). Benedetti was an advocate for the Corsican language, and believed that it should be learned in nursery schools across Corsica.

Benedetti died on 19 November 2018 in Bastia, Corsica. Tributes were given to him by fellow politicians René Cret, Gérard Revol, Jean-Christian Rey, and Jean-Yves Chapelet.

References

1930 births
2018 deaths
French Senators of the Fifth Republic
Deputies of the 7th National Assembly of the French Fifth Republic
Deputies of the 9th National Assembly of the French Fifth Republic
Mayors of places in Corsica